Sami Seliö (born 5 May 1975 in Lohja, Finland) is a Finnish powerboat racer and two-time Formula 1 Powerboat World Champion. Seliö races for the Mad Croc BaBa Racing team and has competed in the series since 1998.

Racing career
Seliö began his career in Finland in the national SJ-15 class in 1988, a category which he won 1990. By the mid 1990s he had progressed up the classes and in 1996 finished third overall in the Formula 4 World Championship. In 1998 he made his debut in Formula 1 and a string of points finishes brought with it the Rookie of the Year award for 1998. Over the following years Seliö gained experience and in 2005 enjoyed his best season to date as he finished second in the championship. Two years later in 2007, Seliö  won the first of his World Championships. He was 16 points behind Italian Guido Cappellini entering the last race of the season in Sharjah, but as Cappellini wrecked his boat with ten laps to go, Seliö won the race to give him the championship by a margin of just four points.

The 2007 season began a sequence of four consecutive years where Seliö never ended lower than third in the championship. In his title defence year of 2008, he finished runner-up and he slipped one place to third at the end of 2009. The 2010 season would see Seliö clinch his second world title, again coming from behind in the points, this time to beat Jay Price, at the final race of the year.

In October 2011 in Liuzhou, China, Seliö lost control of his boat at 200 km/h and was concussed, broke his ribs and coccyx, and his right eye developed a hematoma. He missed the final two races of the season, but was able to return in time for 2012, where he eventually finished fourth overall. In 2013 Seliö would also finish fourth at the end of the season but entered the final race leading the championship. Having crashed out of qualifying he started well down the field and a retirement in the race meant no points, and the chance at a third title was lost.

Racing record

Complete Formula 1 Powerboat World Championship results

* Season still in progress.

 The 1999 Grand Prix of Russia was halted after 12 laps with results annulled and no points awarded. 
 The starting grid for the 1999 Grand Prix of Turkey was formed on the basis of current championship standings following the İzmit earthquake, with the race held as planned on Sunday 22 August.
 The 1999 Grand Prix of Austria was stopped after seven laps, with the results taken from the completion of the seventh lap, and no points awarded.
 The 2004 Grand Prix of Korea was run under the 'match race' format, and the event thus did not count towards the final championship standings and no points were awarded.
 The 2005 Grand Prix of Singapore was halted after 18 laps, with half points awarded.

References

Finnish motorboat racers
1975 births
People from Lohja
Living people
Formula 1 Powerboat drivers
Sportspeople from Uusimaa